Petrovina is a village near Jastrebarsko, Croatia with a population of 246 (2011).

References

Populated places in Zagreb County